This article lists the first, second, third and fourth-placed runners in the Grand National, a National Hunt horse race held annually over a distance of 4 miles 3½ furlongs at Aintree Racecourse in England.

Shaded areas indicate the unofficial precursors of the Grand National (1836–38), the wartime substitutes at Gatwick Racecourse (1916–18), the cancelled period during World War II (1941–45) and the void race in 1993.

The list features two horses called Peter Simple and two called Royal Mail. It also includes two with slightly different spellings, Mathew (1847) and Matthew (1902). For the purposes of this article, the horses with identical names are distinguished by (1) and (2).

Grand National 1–2–3–4

Horses placed more than once
A list of horses which have achieved a first-four placing in the Grand National on more than one occasion.

Shading indicates a horse placed in an unofficial 1830s precursor or a wartime substitute race.

References

Bibliography

External links
 aintree.co.uk – Grand National Media Guide.
 archive.org – Read Online: "A History of Steeple-Chasing" (1901).
 archive.org – Read Online: "Heroes and Heroines of the Grand National" (1907).
 bbc.co.uk – National finishes year-by-year.
 galopp-sieger.de – The Grand National Steeplechase at Aintree.
 pedigreequery.com – Grand National – Aintree.
 sports123.com – Grand National.

Grand National